Teenage Mutant Ninja Turtles: Fall of the Foot Clan, released as Teenage Mutant Hero Turtles: Fall of the Foot Clan in Europe, and  in Japan, is a Game Boy game developed and published by Konami in August 1990. The game is based on the 1987 Teenage Mutant Ninja Turtles television series. The Turtles' first Game Boy game is a platforming-style game, where Leonardo, Michaelangelo, Raphael, and Donatello must battle against Krang and Shredder and save their friend April O'Neil in the process. The game was re-released as part of Teenage Mutant Ninja Turtles: The Cowabunga Collection in 2022.

Gameplay 
The player takes control of one of the Turtles through a total of five stages, battling Krang and Shredder's minions along the way. Enemies include Foot Soldiers, Mousers and Roadkill Rodney among others. If a Turtle runs out of health, he is captured and the player must select another Turtle to pick up where he left off. If all four Turtles are captured, the game is over. One can regain lost health by collecting pizza or by winning the hidden mini-games scattered throughout each stage. There are a total of five stages, each with a unique end-boss: Rocksteady, Bebop, Baxter Stockman, Shredder, and Krang. The player can choose which stage to start the game on, but the game needs to be completed from Stage 1 to see the full ending.

Sequels
The game got 2 sequels: Teenage Mutant Ninja Turtles II: Back from the Sewers in 1991, and Teenage Mutant Ninja Turtles III: Radical Rescue in 1993.

References

External links
 

1990 video games
Konami games
Platform games
Science fiction video games
Fall of the Foot Clan
Video games set in New York City
Game Boy games
Video games scored by Michiru Yamane
Video games developed in Japan